White Calf Mountain is located in the Lewis Range, Glacier National Park in the U.S. state of Montana. White Calf Mountain is south of Divide Mountain and just west of the Blackfeet Indian Reservation boundary.

See also
 Mountains and mountain ranges of Glacier National Park (U.S.)

References

White Calf
White Calf
Lewis Range
Mountains of Montana